Ally Shewan (born 5 August 1940) is a Scottish former footballer. He joined Aberdeen, his only club at the professional level, in 1960, and was almost ever-present from 1963 until his departure in 1969. He featured on the losing side in the 1967 Scottish Cup Final.

In the summer of 1967, Aberdeen came to America, playing as the Washington Whips in the fledgling United Soccer Association. The Whips won the Eastern Division and met the Los Angeles Wolves (actually Wolverhampton Wanderers) in the championship game. In the 122nd minute of extra time with the match tied 5–5, Shewan scored an own goal, giving Los Angeles a 6–5 win and the title.

After leaving Aberdeen Shewan spent time in Australia then played for, and later managed, Elgin City, when they played in the Highland Football League. Shewan, described as a "no-nonsense left-back", is a member of Aberdeen Football Club's Hall of Fame, inducted in 2004.

Career statistics

Club 
Appearances and goals by club, season and competition

References

Harry Reid (2005), "The Final Whistle?", Birlinn, 

1940 births
Living people
Association football fullbacks
People from Turriff
Footballers from Aberdeenshire
Scottish footballers
Aberdeen F.C. players
Elgin City F.C. players
Washington Whips players
Scottish Football League players
Scottish football managers
Elgin City F.C. managers
Highland Football League players
Scottish expatriate sportspeople in the United States
Expatriate soccer players in the United States
Scottish expatriate footballers